Korn Chatikavanij (born 19 February 1964 in London) is a Thai Democrat Party politician, best selling author, and former investment banker. From 2008 to 2011, he was finance minister under Abhisit Vejjajiva.

Early life
Korn was born in Princess Beatrice Hospital, London, England, to Mr. Kraisri and Mrs. Rumpa Chatikavanij (née Brahmopala).  His father was Commissioner of the Customs Department, Commissioner of the Revenue Department, and Director of the Fiscal Policy Office. His grandfather, Phraya Athikarnprakat, was Police Commissioner and a member of the Privy Council for King Prajadhipok (Rama VII). His uncle, Kasem Chatikavanij, was the founder of the Electricity Generating Authority of Thailand (EGAT). The first ancestor of the Chatikavanijs was Siang sae Sol, a Chinese immigrant from Fujian Province who came to Siam around the 1770s. Siang's grandson, Jard Sae Sol commissioned the construction of a Chinese-styled house known as Sou Heng Tai in Talad Noi during the early-19th century.

Korn attended Somtavil and Patumwan Demonstration School, Srinakharinwirot University, in Bangkok until the 6th grade, when he attended Winchester College boarding school in England. He read politics, philosophy, and economics (PPE) at St. John's College, University of Oxford and graduated with honours. While at St. John's College, he was a classmate of Abhisit Vejjajiva.

Investment banker
Korn worked in asset management at SG Warburg while a student and joined the firm after his graduation. He left Warburg and returned to Thailand in 1988, founding J.F. Thanakom, a joint venture between Jardine Flemings and Finance One. JF Thakakom became the kingdom's largest brokerage by 1995-6 and became the first Thai investment bank to manage a public takeover, as well as the first to lead manage a Euro-convertible for a Thai firm, with Korn at the helm. In 1999, JF Thanakom was sold to JP Morgan (later JP MorganChase). Korn stayed on as Senior Country Officer.

2005-2006 Thai political crisis and the 2006 coup

Korn left JP Morgan in October 2004, joined the Democrat Party to run for office, and subsequently went on to win a seat in Bangkok’s 2nd constituency (Sathorn – Yannawa) in the general elections of February 2005. After the defeat of the Democrat Party, Abhisit Vejjajiva replaced Banyat Banthadthan as Democrat Party leader. Korn was appointed Deputy Secretary General and Secretary for Economic Affairs of the Party. He became a vocal member of the opposition to the government of Thaksin Shinawatra during the 2005-2006 Thai political crisis. During the same period, Korn played a major role in examining the economic policies of Thaksin's government including the Shin Corporation Deal Scandal.

On the night of 19 September 2006, the Thaksin government was overthrown by 2006 coup. Korn expressed his opinion that he was "sad" and felt that it was "understandable for any democracy to denounce coups as a concept in general", however he felt that the coup had to be examined "within the context of the Thai political situation." Korn was reelected in the post-coup 2007 elections, but the Democrat Party remained in the opposition after losing to the People's Power Party. During both Samak Sundaravej and Somchai Wongsawat's brief terms as prime minister, Korn served as shadow finance minister for the Democrat Party.

2008-2011, member of Abhisit government

On 2 December 2008, the Constitutional Court dissolved the People's Power Party. Abhisit Vejjajiva was subsequently appointed prime minister after a parliamentary vote. Korn was appointed finance minister in the Abhisit administration in December 2009.

Korn's significant achievements as Minister of Finance include: a 117-billion baht stimulus package initiated in January 2009 and a second stimulus package, valued at over 1.4 trillion baht in 2010–2012. Most of the funds were spent improving infrastructure in Thailand, especially irrigation and transportation, public health, education, and tourism.

Korn focused on policies that addressed social inequality and poverty. He pushed through a bill in the Thai cabinet in April 2010 on land and building tax (property tax), part of a plan to overhaul the country's tax structure as the first step to achieving a balanced budget.

Korn helped refinance loan shark debt for over 500,000 Thais, many of whom were being charged more than 100% per annum interest on their loans.

In January 2010, Korn was named "Finance Minister of the Year 2010", both globally and for the Asia Pacific region by The Banker magazine of the Financial Times. The magazine complimented the Thai minister on his "financial management skills as he assumed the finance ministerial position in Thailand amid the economic stagnation". He was also given credit for his contributions to promote and enhance financial and economic cooperation in ASEAN. Korn is the only Thai to have received both awards.

As then Chair of the ASEAN Finance Ministers' meetings in 2009, Korn helped create the Chiang Mai Initiative Multilateralization (CMIM), a regional foreign reserve pool to remedy currency flow shortages.

After the Democrats were defeated in the 2011 election, Korn's term as finance minister ended and he took on the role of Shadow Deputy Prime Minister for Economic Affairs in Abhisit Vejjajiva's shadow cabinet. He was replaced by Securities and Exchange Commission (SEC) economist Thirachai Phuvanatnaranubala.

In May 2011, the editorial pages of both the Japan Times and the South China Morning Post mentioned Korn as a possible candidate to replace Dominique Strauss-Kahn as head of the International Monetary Fund (IMF) for "his deep understanding of financial markets". Moreover, it was mentioned that the position should not be limited to candidates exclusively from the US and the European Union, as there were many good candidates from Africa, Asia, and Latin America. Korn did not accept a position with the IMF but instead continued his work with the Democrat Party.

2014–2020: post-coup activities

Prior to the 2014 Thai coup d'état, Korn chaired the Democrat Party's Policy Unit. In his capacity as the Chair of the Policy Unit, Korn helped transform the party's platform to become more research oriented and issue-based. The main focus of his research centred around the topics of education reform, enhancing irrigation technology to increase crop yields, and increasing the value of agricultural products.

Korn travelled extensively in Asia to advocate a reorganization and rebalancing of multilateral institutions to reflect the shift in economic power away from North America and Europe towards Asia. In an opinion piece in the Nikkei Asian Review, Korn wrote: "Clear double standards in how Western institutions treat those outside their 'club' have drawn a significant response from developing countries. ASEAN, with the cooperation of China, Japan and South Korea, managed in 2010 to create a foreign exchange reserves pool named the Chiang Mai Initiative—a multilateral currency swap mechanism aimed at preventing a repeat of the Asian Financial Crisis, when they were forced to kowtow to unsympathetic multilateral institutions."
    
In August 2014, Korn established Kaset Khem Kaeng, a non-profit with a mission to help small farmers practice sustainable farming and receive fair compensation for their produce. The project started as a joint venture between the company and one small village in Maha Sarakham Province, one of the poorest provinces in Thailand. The company was able successfully to buy chemical-free Jasmine rice from farmers at 20,000–25,000 baht per tonne compared to the market rate of only 8,000 baht per tonne.

In March 2015, Korn presented a vision for modern Thai entrepreneurship by interviewing twelve Thai entrepreneurs in the book Dare to Do กล้าลุย ไม่กลัวล้ม" 12 เส้นทางความสำเร็จของ 12 ยอดนักธุรกิจแห่งยุค.

In January 2020, Korn resigned from the Democrat Party, leading to speculation that he might form a new party. The following day, he was followed by Democrat Party MP Attawit Suwanpakdee, lending credence to the notion that a new party is in the works. That party came into being on 14 February 2020, when Korn and his political allies registered a new party with the Election Commission. It is called the "Kla Party".

Korn contributes regularly to the Bangkok Post, Forbes (Thailand), and GQ (Thailand).

References

External links
Korn Chatikavanij's official website
PublicAffairsAsia report on Korn speech

1964 births
Korn Chatikavanij
Korn Chatikavanij
Korn Chatikavanij
Alumni of St John's College, Oxford
People educated at Winchester College
Korn Chatikavanij
Korn Chatikavanij
Korn Chatikavanij
Living people
Korn Chatikavanij